2011 IHF Super Globe was the IHF Men's Super Globe 5th edition. It was held in Doha, Qatar at Al-Gharafa Sports Club Hall.

The teams that take part will be the respective continental champions.

Teams

Schedule and results

Group A
All kick-off times are local (UTC+03:00).

Group B
All kick-off times are local (UTC+03:00).

Seventh Place

Fifth place

Bronze Medal

Gold-medal match

External links
Official website
Goalzz.com

2011 in handball
IHF Men's Super Globe
2011 in Qatari sport
Sports competitions in Doha
International handball competitions hosted by Qatar